After the Apocalypse is a 2004 science fiction black-and-white film about five survivors after World War III. A single woman and four men are forced to communicate without words because of destructive gasses from the war. They are forced to recreate their lives both individually and collectively. The film does not have any dialogue.

Production
The film was filmed in Brooklyn and Queens, New York.

Reception
On the film review aggregation website Rotten Tomatoes, After the Apocalypse received a 90% approval rating, based on 9 reviews, with an average rating of 6.8/10. On the website Metacritic, the film has received a score of 53 out of 100 based on 6 reviews.

See also
 Apocalyptic and post-apocalyptic fiction

Notes

External links
 
 

2004 films
2004 science fiction films
American post-apocalyptic films
American black-and-white films
Films without speech
2000s American films